The Videos 1989–2004 is a video album by American heavy metal band Metallica, released on DVD in December 2006. It features all of the band's videos from 1989 to 2004. In its first week of release, the DVD sold 28,000 copies. The menus of the DVD play excerpts of different Metallica songs, including "The Outlaw Torn" (Load), "My Friend of Misery" (Metallica), "Bleeding Me" (Load), "Carpe Diem Baby" (Reload) and "Prince Charming" (Reload).

The disc has been released by Warner Bros. Records, although this is not mentioned anywhere except for the packaging and on the label of the disc itself. Copyright is given to Elektra Entertainment and E/M Ventures in the liner notes and the end credits of the DVD.

Track listing
"One" – 7:41 - filmed December 1988, premiere January 22, 1989
"Enter Sandman" – 5:28 - filmed June 1991, premiere July 30, 1991
"The Unforgiven" – 6:21 - filmed September 1991, premiere November 19, 1991
"Nothing Else Matters" – 6:24 - filmed Spring 1991, premiere February 25, 1992
"Wherever I May Roam" – 6:05 - filmed January and March 1992, premiere May 21, 1992
"Sad but True" – 5:26 - filmed January 1992, premiere October 5, 1992
"Until It Sleeps" – 4:32 - filmed May 1996, premiere May 23, 1996
"Hero of the Day" – 4:30 - filmed August 1996, premiere August 21, 1996
"Mama Said" – 4:51 - filmed November 1996, premiere 1996
"King Nothing" – 5:26 - filmed December 1996, premiere January 7, 1997
"The Memory Remains" – 4:37 - filmed October 1997, premiere November 4, 1997
"The Unforgiven II" – 6:33 - filmed December 1997, premiere January 20, 1998
"Fuel" – 4:35 - filmed May 1998, premiere May 14, 1998
"Turn the Page" – 5:49 - filmed October 1998, premiere October 28, 1998
"Whiskey in the Jar" – 4:43 - filmed November 1998, premiere March 16, 1999
"No Leaf Clover" – 5:33 - filmed April 1999, premiere November 8, 1999
"I Disappear" – 4:28 - filmed April 2000, premiere May 4, 2000
"St. Anger" – 5:50 - filmed May 2003, premiere May 27, 2003
"Frantic" – 4:55 - filmed July 2003, premiere August 15, 2003
"The Unnamed Feeling" – 5:29 - filmed October 2003, premiere December 3, 2003
"Some Kind of Monster" – 4:28 - filmed 2002-2003, premiere June 28, 2004

Bonus tracks
 2 of One – Introduction – 6:00 - filmed March 1989, premiere June 6, 1989
 "One" (Jammin' Version) – 5:27 - filmed December 1988, premiere January 30, 1989
 "The Unforgiven" (Theatrical Version) – 11:29 - filmed September 1991, premiere November 19, 1991
 Metallica: Some Kind of Monster – Film Trailer – 2:27 - filmed 2002-2003, premiere 2004

Production
 Andie Airfix (Satori) – Package Design
 Michael Agel – Band photo
 Mixed at The Document Room, Malibu, CA
 Kevin Shirley – Surround Mix
 Drew Griffiths – Engineer
 Jared Kvitka – Assistant Engineer
 Bob Ludwig (Gateway Mastering) – Surround Audio Mastering
 Ted Jensen (Sterling Sound) – Stereo Audio Mastering
 David May – DVD Producer
 Seann Cowling – DVD Associate Producer
 Raena Winscott – DVD Associate Producer
 Ted Hall (POP Sound) – Post Production Mixer
 Jason Talton  (POP Sound) – Assistant Post Production Mixer
 Sean Donnelly – DVD Menu Design
 Jim Atkins (Media Services Group) – DVD Authoring
 Q Prime Inc – Management

Chart positions

Certifications

References

External links
Announcement at the official website

Metallica video albums
2006 compilation albums
2006 video albums
Music video compilation albums